The 2006 AIG Japan Open Tennis Championships was a tennis tournament played on outdoor hard courts. It was the 33rd edition of the event known that year as the AIG Japan Open Tennis Championships, and was part of the International Series Gold of the 2006 ATP Tour, and of the Tier III Series of the 2006 WTA Tour. Both the men's and the women's events took place at the Ariake Coliseum in Tokyo, Japan, from 2 October through 8 October 2006. Roger Federer and Marion Bartoli won the singles titles.

Finals

Men's singles

 Roger Federer defeated  Tim Henman, 6–3, 6–3

Women's singles

 Marion Bartoli defeated  Aiko Nakamura, 2–6, 6–2, 6–2

Men's doubles

 Ashley Fisher /  Tripp Phillips defeated  Paul Goldstein /  Jim Thomas, 6–2, 7–5

Women's doubles

 Vania King /  Jelena Kostanić defeated  Chan Yung-jan /  Chuang Chia-jung, 7–6(7–2), 5–7, 6–2

References

External links
Official website
Men's Singles draw
Men's Doubles draw
Men's Qualifying Singles draw
Women's Singles, Doubles, and Qualifying Singles draws

AIG Japan Open Tennis Championships
AIG Japan Open Tennis Championships
Japan Open (tennis)
Tennis Championships
AIG Japan Open Tennis Championships